David Beard (born February 23, 1993) is a Canadian football offensive lineman for the Hamilton Tiger-Cats of the Canadian Football League (CFL). He previously attended the University of Alberta where he played CIS football as an offensive and defensive lineman and studied kinesiology.

High school career 
Beard played high school football for the Falcons at Bev Facey Community High School for three years. He saw playing time at various positions, including wide receiver, tight end, and the offensive and defensive lines. Beard also played basketball at Bev Facey.

University career 
From 2011 to 2014, Beard played CIS football for the Alberta Golden Bears. For his first two seasons, he played at the defensive lineman position before being moved to the offensive line by Golden Bears head coach and former Eskimos offensive lineman Chris Morris. In his senior year, Beard was named a second-team All-Canadian and played in the CIS East-West Bowl. He also caught two passes for 31 yards and a touchdown.

Professional career

Edmonton Eskimos / Elks
Beard was selected in the second round of the 2015 CFL Draft by the Edmonton Eskimos with the 16th overall pick. In his CIS career, Beard had only played 16 games as an offensive lineman, and he expected to return to the Golden Bears for a third year at the position. Despite his limited experience, he remained on the active roster after the preseason. Beard made his CFL debut in the season opener on June 27, 2015, against the Toronto Argonauts. He played in the first five games of his rookie season at left guard.

In 2019, he was the unanimous selection for the Edmonton Eskimos' Most Outstanding Offensive Lineman. He re-signed with Edmonton on a contract extension through 2023 on December 26, 2020. He played in 94 games for Edmonton over seven seasons.

Hamilton Tiger-Cats
On September 2, 2022, Beard was traded to the Hamilton Tiger-Cats for Jesse Gibbon and an exchange of 2023 CFL Draft picks.

References

External links
 Hamilton Tiger-Cats bio

1993 births
Living people
Alberta Golden Bears football players
Canadian football offensive linemen
Edmonton Elks players
Hamilton Tiger-Cats players
Players of Canadian football from Alberta
Sportspeople from Sherwood Park